John Bellamy may refer to:
John Bellamy (publisher) (1596–1653), Pilgrim printer of London
John Dillard Bellamy (1854–1942), American congressman
John Haley Bellamy (1836–1914), American folk artist
John Bellamy (sport shooter), British sport shooter

See also
John Bellamy Foster (born 1953), editor of Monthly Review and sociologist